Centrale tram stop is a stop on the Tramlink service in Croydon town centre, serving the Centrale shopping centre. The tram stop was provided and paid for as part of the development of the shopping centre.

The stop operates as a transport interchange with trams stopping on one side of the platform and local buses on the other. Centrale, West Croydon and East Croydon, operate as Tramlink interchanges within the 'Croydon Loop'.

Connections

London Buses routes 157, 264, 407, 410 and 455 serve the tram stop.

History 
On 2 April 2004, The new Centrale shopping centre opened in central Croydon. The facility included a new 1000-space car park, the entrance to which is near the current stop.  A tram stop was planned to service the new shopping centre and this was opened on 10 December 2005.

References

External links 

Centrale tram stop on the Unofficial Tramlink Site
Centrale tram stop on  The Trams website

Tramlink stops in the London Borough of Croydon
Railway stations in Great Britain opened in 2005